Zebronia is a genus of moths of the family Crambidae described by Jacob Hübner in 1821.

Species
Zebronia mahensis (T. B. Fletcher, 1910)
Zebronia ornatalis Leech, 1889
Zebronia phenice (Stoll in Cramer & Stoll, 1782)
Zebronia trilinealis Walker, 1865
Zebronia virginalis Viette, 1958

Former species
Zebronia mariaehelenae Legrand, 1966

References
Maes (2014). "Notes on the Crambidae of Africa with new synonyms and combinations (Lepidoptera Pyraloidea Crambidae)". Lambillionea. 114 (2) 2014: 139–143.

Spilomelinae
Crambidae genera
Taxa named by Jacob Hübner